Aqcheh may refer to:
 Aqcheh, Isfahan
 Aqcheh, Kurdistan

See also
 Aghcheh (disambiguation)
 Aqcheh is a common element in Iranian place names; see